Prince Edward Taw Phaya (also known as Tun Aung, 22 March 1924 – 12 January 2019) was the Pretender to the Throne of Burma (abolished in 1885). He was the second son of Princess Myat Phaya Galay, the fourth daughter of King Thibaw and Queen Supayalat. Upon the death of his aunt Myat Phaya Lat in 1956, he became the Head of the Royal House of Konbaung.

Biography

Taw Phaya was born on 22 March 1924 in Maymyo, British Burma to Ko Ko Naing, a former monk, and Princess Myat Phaya Galay who was the fourth daughter of King Thibaw and Queen Supayalat.

He attended high school at St. Patrick's High School Moulmein and St. Paul's School in Rangoon. He worked as director of Thibaw Commercial Syndicate (TCS) Co. Ltd from 1951 to 1962. He was also Vice President of Association for Buddhism as the National Religion in 1958.

On 4 May 1944, he married his first cousin, Princess Phaya Rita. She was the daughter of Prince Kodawgyi Naing and Princess Myat Phaya, who was the third daughter of Burma's last king, Thibaw Min and the sister of his mother.

Taw Phaya family was not involved in politics, but supported the military caretaker government's anti-communist mission in 1959. The military officials focused on the Taw Phaya family to be used in the operation and invited them to come to Shwebo, which was the beginning of the Konbaung dynasty. After seeing local women spreading their hair to welcome the Taw Phaya family, the Tatmadaw thought it could compete with them for power. As a result, the military later ignored the royal family.

Documentary film
In 2017, Taw Phaya and his elder sister Hteik Su Phaya Gyi, nephew Soe Win, niece Devi Thant Sin appeared as the main characters of We Were Kings, a documentary film by Alex Bescoby and Max Jones. The film premiered in Mandalay on 4 November 2017 at the Irrawaddy Literary Festival and also screened in Thailand at the Foreign Correspondents' Club of Thailand. The film is about Myanmar's history, but also about the descendants of the last kings of Burma who lived  unassuming lives in modern Myanmar, unrecognized and unknown.

Death
Taw Phaya died on 12 January 2019 at his Pyin Oo Lwin Residence. After his death, his eldest son, Richard Taw Phaya is presumed to be the Head of the Royal House of Konbaung, although no confirmation has been made since.

Family
Taw Phaya had five sons and two daughters: 
 Richard Taw Phaya Myat Gyi (born 14 May 1945), He married two times, he first married at Rangoon in May 1962 to Hteik Su Margaret Phaya Htwe (b. at Rangoon, 20 August 1927; d. from a brain haemorrhage, at Maymyo, 21st June, 2003), his paternal aunt, younger daughter of U Ko Ko Naing, by his wife, H.R.H. Princess (Ashin Hteik Suhpaya) Mayat Phaya Galay. m. (second) at Rangoon, 1993, Myint Myint Aye. He had issue, one son by his first wife:
 Maung Aung Khine (b. 1962)
 David Taw Phaya Myat (born 1 April 1947).
 Edward Taw Phaya Myat Nge (born 27 April 1948 - died 14 November 1955).
 Joseph Taw Phaya Myat Aye (born 19 March 1950).
 Paul Taw Phaya Myat Thaike (born 19 February 1954).
 Ann-Marie Su Phaya Lay (born 10 September 1952).
 Rose-Marie Su Phaya Naing (born 21 April 1956).

Ancestry

References

External links 
 A rare meeting with the last of Burma's royals

1924 births
2019 deaths
Konbaung dynasty
People from Mandalay Region
Pretenders to the Burmese throne
Burmese people of World War II
Burmese princes